The Slammy Awards is a concept used by WWE, where awards, similar to the Academy and Grammy Awards, are given to professional wrestlers and other individuals within WWE, such as commentators and managers. Introduced in 1986, there have been 13 editions of the concept. The awards are a mixture of "serious" and "tongue-in-cheek". Winners of the award receive a statuette that depicts one wrestler holding another over his head.

The awards were discontinued after 2015. The same year, the NXT brand debuted its own exclusive awards, the NXT Year-End Awards (also rewarding the NXT UK brand since 2019), with wrestlers from Raw and SmackDown being instead rewarded by the WWE Year-End Award in 2018 and 2019.

In 2020, it was announced that WWE would be reviving the Slammy Awards for their Raw and SmackDown brands, with the winners announced live on the WWE Network. The ceremony aired on December 23, 2020.

Shawn Michaels and The Undertaker hold the record for the most Slammy Awards won by a WWE superstar at fifteen each.

Versions

1986 Slammy Awards
The Slammy Awards was initially conceived to commemorate the release of The Wrestling Album, a music album featuring various professional wrestlers from the World Wrestling Federation (WWF, now known as WWE). The ceremony took place on March 1, 1986, from the Civic Center in Baltimore, and aired live on MTV. Martha Quinn served as an interviewer. Gene Okerlund, Jimmy Hart, Hillbilly Jim, and Junkyard Dog performed their songs from the album.

Winners are listed first, highlighted in boldface.

1987 Slammy Awards
The Slammy Awards returned a year later, now honoring the events and individuals involved within the professional wrestling aspect of the World Wrestling Federation. The second edition of the ceremony (referred to in commercials and on-air as the 37th annual Slammy Awards) took place on December 16, 1987, from Caesars Atlantic City in Atlantic City, New Jersey. It aired in syndication on December 19, 1987. The ceremony was hosted by Jesse Ventura and Gene Okerlund. Musical numbers were performed by Vince McMahon (singing the song "Stand Back") and Jimmy Hart (singing "Girls in Cars"), with the entire WWF roster performing "If You Only Knew" as the show's closing number.

Winners are listed first, highlighted in boldface.

1994 Slammy Awards
Dormant for years, the Slammy Awards returned on a special edition of WWF Mania which aired on December 31, 1994. Todd Pettengill and Stephanie Wiand presented the awards from the WWF television studios.

Winners are listed first, highlighted in boldface.

1996 Slammy Awards
The fourth edition of the Slammy Awards took place on March 30, 1996, from the Anaheim Marriott in Anaheim, California. It aired live on USA Network, and was hosted by Todd Pettengill.

Winners are listed first, highlighted in boldface.

1997 Slammy Awards
The fifth edition of the Slammy Awards took place on March 21, 1997, from the Westin Hotel in Chicago. It aired live on USA Network, and there was two celebrity presenters were Cindy Margolis and Walter Payton

Winners are listed first, highlighted in boldface.

2010 Slammy Awards
The event took place on December 13, 2010, from the New Orleans Arena in New Orleans. The awards were presented on Raw, with "supplemental" awards given on WWE's website. The "Superstar of the Year" award was decided by a fan vote, which were cast through WWE's website.

Winners are listed first, highlighted in boldface.

2011 Slammy Awards
The event took place on December 12, 2011, from the Norfolk Scope in Norfolk, Virginia. The awards were presented on Raw, with additional awards given on WWE's website. The "Superstar of the Year" award was decided by a fan vote, which were cast through WWE's website.

Winners are listed first, highlighted in boldface.

2012 Slammy Awards 
The event took place on December 17, 2012, from the Wells Fargo Center in Philadelphia. Awards were presented on Raw, on WWE's website, and on the TLC: Tables, Ladders & Chairs pre-show the day before. Votes for several categories were cast through the WWE App during the live broadcast; over 583,000 votes were tallied.

Winners are listed first, highlighted in boldface.

2013 Slammy Awards
This event took place on December 9, 2013, from the KeyArena in Seattle, Washington, and was hosted by Booker T and Jerry Lawler. The awards were presented on Raw, its pre-show, and on WWE's website. Votes were cast through the WWE App during the live broadcast; over 1.64 million votes were tallied.

Winners are listed first, highlighted in boldface.

2014 Slammy Awards
This event took place on December 8, 2014, from the Bon Secours Wellness Arena in Greenville, South Carolina. It was hosted by Seth Green. The awards were presented on Raw, its pre-show and on WWE's website. Votes were cast through WWE's website for the pre-show and website awards, while the main categories were voted through the WWE App during the live broadcast.

Winners are listed first, highlighted in boldface.

2015 Slammy Awards
This event took place on December 21, 2015, from the Target Center in Minneapolis, Minnesota.  Awards were presented on Raw, its pre-show, and WWE's website. Votes were cast for certain categories through Twitter, Instagram and Facebook, with voting for additional categories occurring on the WWE App during the live show.

Winners are listed first, highlighted in boldface.

2020 Slammy Awards
This event took place on December 23, 2020, and aired through WWE’s digital and social media platforms.

Winners are listed first, highlighted in boldface.

See also 
 List of professional wrestling awards
 List of Pro Wrestling Illustrated awards
 List of Wrestling Observer Newsletter awards
 NXT Year-End Award

References

Professional wrestling awards
Awards established in 1986
WWE
Professional wrestling-related lists